Anil Gharai (alt., Anil Ghařāi, Anil Gharai is a Bengali writer from the state of West Bengal in India. He was born on 1 November 1957 in Rukminipur village near Egra in what is now Purba Medinipur district. His first short story was published in 1990 in Desh patrika. He was an author of 74 books.

List of major works

Novels 

 Nunbari
 Megh Jiboner Trishna (1996)
 Banabashi (1990)
 Mukuler Gondho (1993)
 Boba Juddho (1993)
 Tarango Lata (1993)
 Kanone Kusum Koli (1993)
 Brokrorekha (1994)
 Plaban (1994)
 Dhormer Kol (1995)
 Koler Putul (1996)
 Dourbogorar Upakhayan (1997)
 Khelaghor (1998)
 Janma Daag (1999)
 Biparid Juddheyr Mohora (2001)
 Pata Orar Din (2002)
 Samne Sagar (2003)
 Ananta Draghimaa (2009)

Story Books 

 Kak (1982)
 Parijan (1985)
 Aagun (1987)
 Gyan Brikher Fol (1988)
 Kotash (1990)
 Jol Chiruni (1991)
 Jermaner Maa (1991)
 Bharatborsho (1992)
 Garbha Dao (1993)
 Anil Gharai er Choto Golpo (1995)
 Kaamkuthiya (1996)
 Akash Maatir Khela (1997)
 Loo (1997)
 Swapner Khora Pakhi (1998)
 Swet Paddyo (1998)
 Godana (1998)
 Akhhormala (1998)
 Neel Aakasher Tara (1999)
 Parijaan O Anyanno Golpo (2000)
 Saadh Bhokkhon (2000)
 Nodi Maa (2000)
 Hriday Pete Aachi (2002)
 Lodha Grame Shuryaday (2003)
 Shreshtha Golpo (Bookfair 2008)

Children's Story Books 

 Laali Duli (1992)
 Foring Singh er Bahaduri (1998)
 Sheru (1999)
 Arfaan Chachar Ghora (2000)

English Story Books 

 Stories of the Downtroden (2003)
 Noonbari (2005)

Hindi Story Books 

 Tikli (1999)
 Dankk (1999)
 Fulpari (2001)
 Chawkidaar (2002)

Poetry Books 

 Batasher Swarolipi (2003)
 Jaadu Orna (2004)
 Roudro Songshkaar (2005)
 Aaguner Padabali (2009)
 Ghaam Ashru O Aagun (2009)
 Pata Shorir (2010)
 Bhatful Bahtgondho (2011)
 Bonshai Bishaad (2012)

A book named "Shwetpadma"(collection of few short stories) is also available in the market.

Awards and honors
Sanskriti Award (1991)by President of India 
Michael Madusudhan Award (1994)
Tarashankar Award (2001)
 Bamkim Smriti Purashkaar -2010
 Dalit Sahitya Academy Purashkar

References

Bengali male poets
People from Purba Medinipur district
1957 births
Writers from Kolkata
Indian male novelists
Poets from West Bengal
Indian children's writers
Bengali-language writers
20th-century Indian poets
Living people
Indian male poets
20th-century Indian novelists
Novelists from West Bengal
20th-century Indian male writers